Psi Scorpii, which is Latinized from ψ Scorpii, is a star in the zodiac constellation of Scorpius. It is white in hue and has an apparent visual magnitude of 4.94, which is bright enough to be faintly visible to the naked eye. Based upon parallax measurements, it is located at a distance of around 162 light years  from the Sun. Data collected during the Hipparcos mission suggests it is an astrometric binary, although nothing is known about the companion. The system is drifting closer to the Sun with a radial velocity of −5 km/s.

The visible component is an A-type main sequence star with a stellar classification of A1 V; a class of star that is still fusing hydrogen at its core. It has around twice the mass and 2.2 times the radius of the Sun, and is shining with 18.6 times the Sun's luminosity. The effective temperature of the star's outer atmosphere is 8,846 K. Psi Scorpii is around 451 million years old and is spinning with a projected rotational velocity of 42.3 km/s.

References

External links
 

A-type main-sequence stars
Astrometric binaries

Scorpius (constellation) 
Scorpii, Psi 
Durchmusterung objects
Scorpii, 15
145570
079375
6031